Kľačany is a village and municipality in Hlohovec District in the Trnava Region of western Slovakia.

Etymology
Slovak Kľačane – settlers living near "kľak" ("bended wood", typically a floodplain forest or knee timber).

History
In historical records the village was first mentioned in 1256.

Geography
The municipality lies at an altitude of 170 metres and covers an area of 10.105 km². It has a population of about 976 people.

Genealogical resources

The records for genealogical research are available at the state archive "Statny Archiv in Nitra, Slovakia"

 Roman Catholic church records (births/marriages/deaths): 1756-1895 (parish B)
 Lutheran church records (births/marriages/deaths): 1783-1919 (parish B)

See also
 List of municipalities and towns in Slovakia

References

External links
https://web.archive.org/web/20080111223415/http://www.statistics.sk/mosmis/eng/run.html
Surnames of living people in Klacany

Villages and municipalities in Hlohovec District